Eric Dooley (born July 14, 1965) is an American football coach and former player. He is the head football coach at Southern University in Baton Rouge, Louisiana, a position he has held since the 2022 season. Dooley served as the head football coach at Prairie View A&M University in Prairie View, Texas from 2018 to 2021.

A former Grambling State University player, Dooley also spent one season in the Arena Football League with the Arizona Rattlers in 1993.

Head coaching record

References

External links
 Southern profile

1965 births
Living people
American football defensive backs
American football wide receivers
Arizona Rattlers players
Arkansas–Pine Bluff Golden Lions football coaches
Grambling State Tigers football coaches
Grambling State Tigers football players
Prairie View A&M Panthers football coaches
Southern Jaguars football coaches
Southern University at New Orleans alumni
Southern University alumni
African-American coaches of American football
African-American players of American football
20th-century African-American sportspeople
21st-century African-American sportspeople